The Roman Catholic Diocese of Surabaya is a suffragan Latin diocese, in located on Java island, in Indonesia and administers parishes in the northern and western parts of East Java province.

Its cathedral episcopal see is the Katedral Hati Kudus Yesus, in the city of Surabaya.

History 
 Established on February 15, 1928 as the Apostolic Prefecture of Surabaia, on territory split off from the then Apostolic Vicariate of Batavia (now Metropolitan Archdiocese of Jakarta)
 October 16, 1941: Promoted as Apostolic Vicariate of Surabaia, still a missionary pre-diocesan jurisdiction but hence entitled to a titular bishop.
 Promoted on January 3, 1961 as Diocese of Surabaia
 August 22, 1973: Renamed as Diocese of Surabaya

Ordinaries 
(all Roman rite, initially missionary members of a Latin congregation)
Apostolic Prefects of Surabaya
 Teofilo Emilio de Backere, (C.M.) (1928.06.06 – 1937)
 Michele Verhoeks, C.M. (1937.10.22 – 1941.10.16 see below)
Apostolic Vicariate of Surabaya

 Michele Verhoeks, C.M. (1941.10.16 – death 1952.05.08), Titular Bishop of Eleutheropolis in Palæstina (1941.10.16 – 1952.05.08)
 , C.M. (1953.02.19 – 1961.01.03 see below)

Suffragan Bishops of Surabaya 
 , C.M. (see above January 3, 1961 – 1982), Titular Bishop of Germanicopolis (1961.01.03 – 1982)
 Aloysius Josef G. Dibjokarjono (April 2, 1982 – March 26, 1994)
 Johannes Sudiarna Hadiwikarta (March 26, 1994 – death December 13, 2003)
 Vincentius Sutikno Wisaksono (April 3, 2007 – ...)

Sources and External Links 
 GCatholic.org, with incumbent biography links
 Catholic Hierarchy

Roman Catholic dioceses in Indonesia
Christian organizations established in 1928
Roman Catholic dioceses and prelatures established in the 20th century
East Java